EUROTEM, alternatively Hyundai EURotem, is a joint enterprise between Hyundai Rotem of South Korea and TÜVASAŞ of Turkey which was founded in 2006 and started production in December 2007.

The Hyundai EURotem factory in Adapazarı, Turkey, was built as the Hızlı Tren Fabrikası (High-Speed Train Factory) with the purpose of manufacturing the next generation of Turkey's high-speed trainsets.

Product history
Hyundai EURotem has built 24 DMU units and 96 EMU units for the Turkish State Railways.

On January 30, 2009, the first 8 trains (each with 4 coaches) built by Hyundai EURotem for the Istanbul Metro entered service. Hyundai EURotem will build a total of 92 new wagons for the M2 line, at a total cost of $127 million. These trains are air conditioned and equipped with LCD screens, as well as dynamic digital maps showing the location and direction of the train.

Future products
In 2008 Hyundai EURotem received an order for 440 EMU cars for the Marmaray project.

See also
 High-speed rail in Turkey
 Istanbul Metro
 TÜVASAŞ
 Hyundai Rotem
 HSR-350x
 KTX-II

References 

High-speed trains of Turkey
Rail vehicle manufacturers of Turkey
2006 in rail transport
Manufacturing companies established in 2006
Turkish companies established in 2006
Manufacturing companies based in Istanbul